BZO may refer to:
 Bolzano Airport, with IATA code BZO
 Alliance for the Future of Austria, abbreviated BZÖ
 Bozaba language, a Bantu language of the Democratic Republic of the Congo